The Lycoming IO-580 engine is a horizontally opposed, six-cylinder aircraft engine featuring three cylinders per side, manufactured by Lycoming Engines.

There is no carburetted version of the engine, which would have been designated O-580 and therefore the base model is the IO-580.

This engine family competes with the Continental IO-550 series which are also six-cylinder engines with similar power output and weight.

Design and development
The IO-580 had originally been developed at the behest of Cessna, who were looking for a modern engine to power their Cessna 206 Stationair. Development was slow, and the aircraft was delayed to wait for the engine. When production began, Cessna found problems with the cylinders, and instead of further delaying the introduction, they moved the 206 to the older and less powerful 260 hp Lycoming IO-540. Lycoming eventually addressed all of the problems, and the engine found some use in various aerobatic aircraft, but no serious production was undertaken.

The engine has a fuel injection system which meters fuel in proportion to the induction airflow through air-bled nozzles at the individual cylinder intake ports. The cylinders have air-cooled heads cast from aluminum-alloy with a fully machined combustion chamber.

The first IO-580 was type certified on 12 August 1997 on the regulatory basis of FAR 33 effective February 1, 1965 as amended to 33-1 through 33-18. The engine is certified for use in either tractor or pusher configuration installations.

Variants
IO-580-A1A
Six-cylinder, horizontally opposed, air-cooled direct drive,  at 2500 rpm, dry weight , PAC-RSA-10ED1 fuel-injection system, certified 12 August 1997
IO-580-B1A
Six-cylinder, horizontally opposed, air-cooled direct drive,  at 2700 rpm, dry weight , PAC-RSA-10ED1 fuel-injection system, certified 23 March 2001
AEIO-580-B1A
Six-cylinder, horizontally opposed, air-cooled direct drive,  at 2700 rpm, dry weight , certified 13 August 2007. This model has an aerobatic fuel and oil system. It may be equipped with either the PAC-RSA-10ED1 fuel-injection system or a Lycoming FM-250 system.

Applications
Bearhawk 5
Cessna NGP
MSW Votec 252T
Rockwell Super Commander
IO-580-B1A
Expedition E350 - factory installation
Evektor VUT100-131i SuperCobra
AEIO-580-B1A
Extra 330
Game Composites GB1 GameBird
XtremeAir Sbach 342 (XA 42)
XtremeAir XA41

Specifications (IO-580-A1A)

See also

References

1990s aircraft piston engines
IO-580
1997 introductions